Chernetsky, Chernetskiy or Tchernetsky (Russian: Чернецкий, Ukrainian: Чернецький) is a Slavic masculine surname, its feminine counterpart is Chernetskaya, Tchernetskaya or Chernetska (Russian: Чернецкая, Ukrainian: Чернецька). 
The surname may refer to the following notable people:
Arkady Chernetsky (born 1950), Russian politician 
Juliya Chernetsky (born 1982), American television personality 
Nikolay Chernetskiy (born 1959), Soviet sprinter 
Oleksandr Chernetskyi (born 1984), Ukrainian Greco-Roman wrestler
Semyon Chernetsky (1881–1950), Soviet military music conductor

See also
 Czarnecki
 

Russian-language surnames
Ukrainian-language surnames